Grey Southeast was a federal electoral district represented in the House of Commons of Canada from 1917 to 1935. It was located in the province of Ontario. This riding was created in 1914 from parts of Grey East and Grey South ridings when the county of Grey was re-divided into two ridings, Grey North and Grey Southeast.

The southeast riding consisted of the towns of Durham and Hanover, and the villages of Markdale, Dundalk, Flesherton and Chatsworth, and the townships of Bentinck, Normandy, Glenelg, Egremont, Proton, Artemesia, Osprey, Holland and Sullivan.

In 1924, it was redefined to consist of the part of the county of Grey lying south of and including the townships of Sullivan, Holland, Artemesia and Osprey.

The electoral district was abolished in 1933 when it was redistributed between Grey North and Grey—Bruce ridings.

It was the first riding in Canada to elect a female Member of Parliament, when it elected Agnes MacPhail of the Progressive Party in the 1921 election.

Election results

|}

|}

|}

|}

|}

See also 

 List of Canadian federal electoral districts
 Past Canadian electoral districts

External links 
Riding history from the Library of Parliament

Former federal electoral districts of Ontario